The Sri Lanka national football team ( Shri Lanka Papandu Kandayama) represents Sri Lanka in Association football and is administered by Football Sri Lanka, the governing body of football in Sri Lanka. They have been a member of FIFA since 1952 and a member of AFC since 1954. Sri Lanka's home stadium is the Sugathadasa Stadium in Colombo. The Sri Lankan team was known as the Ceylon national football team until 1972 when Ceylon was renamed Sri Lanka.

A member of the AFC, the team has yet to make their first appearance in FIFA World Cup or AFC Asian Cup finals. They have been South Asian champions once, in 1995. As is true elsewhere on the sub-continent, top-level football in Sri Lanka stands somewhat in the shadow of the country's Cricket team. However, the side did reach the second qualification stage for the 2006 World Cup. In the same year, they became the runners-up in the 2006 Challenge Cup.

In 2014, at the 75th anniversary of FFSL, FIFA President Sepp Blatter visited Sri Lanka and opened a new football stadium in Jaffna. During the visit, Blatter said he was not pleased with the development of Football in Sri Lanka and that the authorities haven't taken enough steps to support football on the island. The AFC President Sheikh Salman Bin Ibrahim Al Khalifa also joined the visit.

In the qualification round of the 2018 World Cup, Sri Lanka lost both matches against Bhutan and failed to qualify for the next round. However, Sri Lanka national football team had managed to qualify for the semi-finals of the 2015 SAFF Championship.

History

Early history 
Football was introduced to Sri Lanka (then called Ceylon) by the British. There is evidence of it being played in Galle Face, a sandy area near the coast, by British servicemen stationed in Colombo in the 1890s. The game was also played at grounds of the barracks at Echelon Barracks and the army grounds (presently the Taj Samudra Hotels).

British servicemen of the Royal Air Force, Royal Navy, Royal Engineers, Royal Artillery and the Royal Garrison Command began and promoted competitive football in Ceylon. The British administrative service and the planting community enthusiastically took it to the Central, Southern, and Up-Country regions. By early 1900 competitive football was popular with the local youth.

The game became popular and local football clubs were formed. St. Michael's SC, Havelock's Football Club, Java Lane SC, Wekande SC, Moors FC, and CH & FC, the last being a European monopoly, were some of the first clubs in Columbo. Harlequins FC and Saunders SC soon joined. The trophies of the early tournaments were the De Mel Shield and the Times of Ceylon Cup.

Football also became popular in the country's Southern Provence, where the planting and administrative community promoted the game. British planter T R. Brough in Deniyaya heavily promoted football in the south between 1910 and 1920, and British servicemen from the Navy wireless station in Matara also helped popularise it.

In 1952, Ceylon became a member of FIFA and got the opportunity to play football at the international level. The country's first International friendly was played against India. The Football Federation organised a tournament called Colombo Cup, which helped the national team to improve their skills and compete with other nations. From the 1960s, the under-19 football team competed in the AFC u19 championship.

1990s to 2018 

In 2015 Sri Lanka played for the first time in the Bangabandhu Cup. This tournament was organised by Bangladesh Football Federation. The national U-23 teams of Thailand, Bahrain, Malaysia and Singapore participated in this tournament. The national football teams of Bangladesh and Sri Lanka also competed in this tournament.

Sri Lanka was placed in the group with Malaysia and Bangladesh. In the first game Sri Lanka played against the Malaysian team. Malaysia won the match by 2–0. The second match was played against the host Bangladesh. Sri Lanka lost the game 1–0. Sri Lanka failed to score a goal in this tournament. After a six years of poor performance in the international football field Sri Lanka football team managed to qualify for the Semi Final of 2015 SAFF Championship. The poor performance continued in the Solidarity Cup as well. They had another shock defeat this time by the hands of Mongolia the lowest ranked team in Asia. As a result of this defeat Sri Lanka eliminated in the Group Stage of the tournament.

In July 2018, Sri Lanka welcomed a historical encounter when they faced Lithuania, marked for the first time Sri Lanka will face a European team. The Sri Lankans managed a respectable 0–0 draw to the UEFA side but lost 0–2 in the second encounter. During 2022 World Cup campaign however, Sri Lanka suffered another poor performance as the team fell 0–1 in Zhuhai to Macau. Macau was subsequently disqualified, as the team refused to travel to Sri Lanka in the aftermath of 2019 Sri Lanka Easter bombings, Sri Lanka was awarded a 3–0 win in response, thus qualified to the second round of the World Cup for the first time since 2006 campaign.

2020–2022: Amir Alagic era

In the second round, Sri Lanka was unlucky to be drawn with four 2019 AFC Asian Cup participants, South Korea, North Korea, Lebanon and Turkmenistan. As predicted, Sri Lanka proved too weak for the group, losing all matches without scoring a single goal as for the end of 2019, and was eliminated from World Cup contention. Sri Lanka had improved since then, and participated in the 2020 Bangabandhu Cup, but the team still finished bottom with two defeats and no goal.

In February 2020, the Football Federation of Sri Lanka announced the appointment of Bosnian-Australian specialist Amir Alagić as head coach of the national team. Sri Lanka then travelled to South Korea to finish their two remaining games against Lebanon and South Korea, losing both, yet optimism rose when Sri Lanka demonstrated an outstanding performance against Lebanon, scoring two goals and only lost by one goal margin, which was also the country's first-ever goals in the qualification. Alagić resigned as coach of Sri Lanka after the qualification, as Sri Lanka, rated as the weakest team in the group, were eliminated without scoring a point. He was replaced by Scottish manager, Andy Morrison.

2023: FIFA suspension
On 22 January 2023, FIFA announced the suspension of the FFSL from 21 January 2023 until further notice. Therefore, all teams/clubs affiliated with the FFSL are no longer entitled to take part in international competitions.

Team image

Media coverage 
There is no official TV broadcaster for the football matches played by the Sri Lanka team because the Football Federation of Sri Lanka has not sold broadcasting rights. The SAFF Championship was broadcast by several channels, and tournaments in the 1990s and 2000s were broadcast free-to-air by Channel Eye. The 2013 SAFF Championship was broadcast by CSN. Star Sports also broadcast the SAFF Championship on pay TV satellite broadcasters.

The official online broadcaster of Sri Lankan football matches is thepapare.com which streams the games of the Sri Lanka Football Premier League, the finals of the Sri Lanka FA Cup, and the AFC U-19 Championship.

Colours 
The team uses different kits for home and away games. The kits are currently manufactured by Grand Sport Group.

Home 
The traditional home kit of the national team has mostly been maroon shirts and maroon shorts, but blue colours have also been used.  The colours are derived from the 15th century flag of Kingdom of Kandy.

Away 
The away shirt colour has changed several times between a white shirt with white shorts or a black shirt with black shorts. White shirt with white shorts has been the more frequent choice.

Home stadiums

Sugathadasa Stadium 

Sugathadasa Stadium is the former athletic stadium in Sri Lanka. It was established in 1972 and has a capacity of 28,000. The stadium is mostly used for athletics and football. The 1995 and 2008 SAFF Championship tournaments were held in this stadium. This is the home stadium of Sri Lanka National Football Team.Sri Lanka won their first major football tournament in his stadium. It was defeating India in the Final of 1995 SAFF Championship.

All the FIFA World Cup qualification matches of Sri Lankan team also played in this ground. This ground has become a lucky ground for Sri Lanka team because they have won much of the matches played in here. The draw against Philippines Football team and The Tajikistan Team were well known. In recent times Sri Lanka lost to Bhutan in 2018 FIFA World Cup qualify matches against Bhutan in this Stadium. The 2014–15 FA Cup Final also held in this ground.

Major football tournaments that played in here were the AFC President's Cup and AFC Challenge Cup.

Kalutara Stadium 
Kalutara Stadium is a multi-use stadium in Kalutara, Sri Lanka. This stadium also known as the Vernon Fernando ground.  It is currently used mostly for football matches and hosts the home games of Kalutara Park SC.  The stadium holds 15,000 people. This stadium is popularly known as "Kalutara Park Ground". This stadium is located in the heart of Kalutara city. This stadium is mostly use in the Sri Lanka Champions League and Sri Lanka FA Cup tournaments.

Results and fixtures 

Matches in the last 12 months, and future scheduled matches

2022

Coaching staff

Coaching history 

  Neville Dias (1990)
  Burkhard Pape (199?)
  Jorge Ferreira (1993–1995)
  M. Karathu (1999–2000)
  Marcos Ferreira (2000–2004)
  Sampath Perera (2004–2006)
  Jang Jung (2007–2008)
  Sampath Perera (2009)
  Mohamed Amanulla (2009–2010)
  Jang Jung (2010–2012)
  Claudio Roberto (2013–2014)
  Nikola Kavazović (2014–2015)
  Sampath Perera (2015–2016)
  Dudley Steinwall (2016–2018)
  Nizam Pakeer Ali (2018–2020)
   Amir Alagić (2020–2022)
  Andy Morrison (2022-present)

Players

Current squad 
 The following players were called up for the 2023 AFC Asian Cup qualification matches.
 Match dates: 8, 11 and 14 June 2022
 Opposition: ,  and 
 Caps and goals correct as of: 10 October 2021, after the match against 

Recent call-ups
The following players have also been called up to the Sri Lanka squad within the last twelve months.

Dilip peiri 

INJ Withdrew due to injury
PRE Preliminary/Standby squad
RET Retired from the national team
SUS Serving suspension
WD Withdrew from the squad due to non-injury issue
COV Tested positive for COVID-19

 Player records 

Players in bold are still active with Sri Lanka.

Most capped players

Top goalscorers

 Competitive record 

 FIFA World Cup 

 AFC Asian Cup 

 SAFF Championship 

 AFC Challenge Cup 

 In 2011 and 2015 The AFC Challenge Cup acted as the qualification for the Asian Cup.
 The AFC Challenge Cup was cancelled by the AFC.

 AFC Solidarity Cup 

 Head-to-head record 

Honours
AFC
 AFC Challenge CupRunners-up (1): 2006

SAFFSAFF ChampionshipChampions (1): 1995
Runners-up (1): 1993South Asian GamesBronze medal (2): 1993, 1995

InvitationalColombo CupRunners-up (1): 1952
Third-place (1): 1954ANFA Cup (Nepal)'''
Runners-up (1): 2009

See also 
 Sri Lanka women's national football team
 Sri Lanka national under-23 football team
 Sri Lanka national under-20 football team
 Sri Lanka national under-17 football team

Notes

References

External links 
 Official website
 Sri Lanka national football team on FIFA
 Sri Lanka national football team picture

 
Asian national association football teams
National sports teams established in 1952